In enzymology, a glycerol-3-phosphate-glucose phosphotransferase is an enzyme that catalyzes the chemical reaction

sn-glycerol 3-phosphate + D-glucose  glycerol + D-glucose 6-phosphate

Thus, the two substrates of this enzyme are sn-glycerol 3-phosphate and D-glucose, whereas its two products are glycerol and D-glucose 6-phosphate.

This enzyme belongs to the family of transferases, specifically those transferring phosphorus-containing groups (phosphotransferases) with an alcohol group as acceptor.  The systematic name of this enzyme class is sn-glycerol-3-phosphate:D-glucose 6-phosphotransferase.

References

 

EC 2.7.1
Enzymes of unknown structure